John Gregory Foreman OAM (born 24 April 1972) is an Australian musician and television personality. In 1992, he joined the Network Ten team for Good Morning Australia with Bert Newton, serving as Music Director until retiring in 2004. During 2003–2008 he was Musical Director of Australian Idol.

Early life 
Foreman was born to a Jewish family in Newcastle, New South Wales, and studied at Kotara High School in Newcastle, before moving to the Conservatorium High School and the Sydney Conservatorium of Music.

Career

Compositions and albums
Foreman released No Jivin''' in 1993 on the BMG label which received an ARIA Award nomination for Best Jazz Album.

In 2000, Foreman wrote the Olympic Flame song, The Flame, performed by Tina Arena for the 2000 Summer Olympics Opening Ceremony.

Foreman wrote Melbourne Girl for the Closing Ceremony of the 2002 Commonwealth Games in Manchester, UK which was performed by Vanessa Amorosi.

In 2004, he produced, orchestrated and conducted Anthony Callea's recording of The Prayer, which received an ARIA Award for the highest selling single by an Australia artist.

He wrote Light The Way for the 2006 Opening Ceremony of the Asian Games in Doha, performed by José Carreras and Majida El Roumi.

Foreman produced albums and/or singles for Marcia Hines, Silvie Paladino, Guy Sebastian, Ricki-Lee Coulter, Carl Riseley and Greta Bradman.

In 2013, he produced Anthony Callea's Christmas album This Is Christmas.

In 2017, Foreman produced Callea's ARIA Number 1 Hits in Symphony, which featured the Melbourne Symphony Orchestra.

He produced the single Proud for Casey Donovan, released in January 2020.

Foreman wrote the background music for Chris Lilley's television shows, Ja'mie: Private School Girl and Jonah from Tonga.

Other television work
In December 2005 Foreman began hosting The Big Night In with John Foreman. The premiere episode featured an interview with actor Russell Crowe, as well as interviews with vocalists Deborah Conway and Tina Cousins.

Foreman became the Musical Director for Melbourne's Christmas Eve Carols by Candlelight, at the Sidney Myer Music Bowl, in 2003. He is Musical Director for the TV Week Logie Awards. In 2008 he appeared alongside Ian Dickson, Cosima De Vito and Guy Sebastian to pay tribute to Shannon Noll on This Is Your Life.

In February 2012 he joined the reboot of Young Talent Time as the Musical Director.

Foreman was musical director for Oprah Winfrey's telecast from the steps of the Sydney Opera House, which featured Hugh Jackman, Nicole Kidman, Olivia Newton-John, Russell Crowe and Keith Urban performing a one-time-only rendition of I Still Call Australia Home with John and his orchestra.

Foreman hosts the annual Schools Spectacular which airs on the Seven Network (previously on Nine). Foreman performed as a soloist at the Schools Spectacular when he was a high school student. 

Since 2019 Foreman was host of Australia Day Live from the Sydney Opera House on ABC TV.

Live performance
Foreman conducted the Australian Philharmonic Orchestra for their Not New Year's Eve Concert at the Sydney Opera House and their New Year's Eve Concert at Hamer Hall in Melbourne in 2012 until 2017.

In 2019 he took over management of the Australian Pops Orchestra and conducted the orchestra's 2019 New Year's Eve Gala Concert, which featured Harrison Craig, Marina Prior, Silvie Paladino and Denis Walter.

He performed as a jazz artist at the Montréal International Jazz Festival in 1995 and the Santa Barbara International Jazz Festival in 1998 and 1999.

Foreman has been musical director for theatre shows for The Production Company, including The Boy From Oz, Dirty Rotten Scoundrels, Hello, Dolly! and Anything Goes.

Creative director and television producer
Foreman became Creative Director for Australia Day in Sydney in 2015. An evening concert on the steps of the Sydney Opera House on Australia Day 2015 featured Jessica Mauboy, Guy Sebastian, Sheppard, The Veronicas, Russell Morris and James Morrison.

He was Creative Director for the Opening Ceremony of the 2013 Asia Pacific Special Olympics Opening Ceremony in Newcastle, which featured Human Nature, Marcia Hines, Doug Parkinson, The McClymonts and local Newcastle performers.

Together with manager Richard Macionis, Foreman was Executive Producer of the Network Ten special, John Foreman Presents Burt Bacharach'' in 2007.

Other roles
Ambassador, Music: Count Us In
Ambassador, Special Olympics Australia.
Board Member, Talent Development Project (TDP).

Discography

Bibliography

References

1972 births
21st-century conductors (music)
21st-century pianists
Australian conductors (music)
Australian pianists
Australian television personalities
Living people
People from Newcastle, New South Wales
Recipients of the Medal of the Order of Australia
Sydney Conservatorium of Music alumni